Mieczysław Mokrzycki (born 29 March 1961 in Majdan Lipowiecki) is the archbishop of Lviv.

Early life and ordination
Mokrzycki completed primary school in Łukawiec and Cieszanów, and then studied at the State Agricultural Technical School in Oleszyce. After graduating from high school, he studied theology at the Catholic University of Lublin. He was ordained a priest on September 17, 1987 by Marian Jaworski, who was diocesan archbishop of Lviv at that time, based in Lubaczów. In 1991 Mokrzycki left for pastoral work in Ukraine. In 1996 he obtained a Doctorate of Sacred Theology from the Pontifical University of Saint Thomas Aquinas, Angelicum.  His dissertation was entitled " (Priestly Formation in the Archdiocese of Lviv of the Latins in light of recent documents after Vatican II).".

Career
On 16 July 2007 he was appointed coadjutor archbishop of Lviv, and consecrated on 29 September 2007 by Pope Benedict XVI as principal consecrator and Cardinals Tarcisio Bertone and Marian Jaworski as co-consecrators. He was one of six bishops consecrated on that day, and the first consecrated by Pope Benedict after his election as Pope. On 21 October 2008 he became Archbishop of the Roman Catholic Archdiocese of Lviv of the Latins (Ukraine) after the resignation of Cardinal Jaworski. On 29 September 2007 Archbishop Mokrzycki was honoured by Lech Kaczyński, the president of Poland, with the Officer's Cross of the Order of Polonia Restituta, for outstanding services to the Polish Church, working for the Poles in Ukraine. He received the pallium from Pope Benedict in June 2009 at a traditional Mass marking the feast of the Solemnity of the Holy Apostles Saints Peter and Paul.

See also

Roman Catholic Archdiocese of Lviv
List of Roman Catholic bishops of Lviv

References

Sources

 http://www.catholic-hierarchy.org/bishop/bmokr.html
 http://www.gcatholic.org/dioceses/diocese/lviv1.htm

1961 births
Living people
People from Lubaczów County
Archbishops of Lviv
Pontifical University of Saint Thomas Aquinas alumni
Polish expatriates in Ukraine
Polish Roman Catholic archbishops